Juan Jácome (born 6 November 1960) is an Ecuadorian footballer. He played in two matches for the Ecuador national football team in 1987. He was also part of Ecuador's squad for the 1987 Copa América tournament.

References

1960 births
Living people
Ecuadorian footballers
Footballers from Quito
Ecuador international footballers
Association football defenders